José Luis Ruiz Casado (Barcelona, 1958 - San Adrián del Besós, 2000) was a Spanish politician for Partido Popular who was killed by ETA.

Bibliography 
José Luis Ruiz Casado was killed by ETA in San Adrian del Besós on September 2, 2000. He worked in private industry at the same time he was councillor of Partido Popular in San Adrián del Besós since 1995. He was married and had two sons. At the time of his murder, he was 42 years old.

Murder 
In March 2000, José Ignacio Krutxaga Elezkano and Fernando García Jodrá moved from France to Barcelona to form the Gaztelugatxe command, which would act in the province of Barcelona. They settled in a rented apartment in Barcelona. In July, Lierni Armendáriz González de Langarika joined the brigade. The ETA's members identified the Councillor of Partido Popular in the Town Hall of Sant Adrià de Besòs by the media and later they located his home using the phone book.

After subjecting him to monitoring and surveillance, they knew his habits and decided to kill him out of his house. On September 21 of 2000, around 7:40 a.m., the Councillor came out of his house and went to his vehicle to go to the Town Hall. It was instants later when Fernando García Jodrá, who awaited along with José Ignacio Krutxaga, shot him from the front, a meter and a half away, reaching his face. At that moment, José Luis was lying on the ground and Garcia Jodra shot him twice in the face. He died immediately.

By the death of José Luis Ruiz Casado, the Central Court of Instruction n ° 5 of the National Court opened Summary No. 21/00. By order of July 13, 2001, José Ignacio Krutxaga Elezkano and Lierni Armendáriz González de Langarika were processed by terrorist offences of murder, motor vehicle theft, damage and falsehood in an official document. By order of February 4, 2002, Fernando García Jodrá was processed for the same offences. The summary was concluded by order of June 26, 2002, and raised on July 2 following Section 4 of the Criminal Chamber being attached to Room Roll No. 15/00. The Fourth Section of the Criminal Chamber of the National Court decided by order of November 3, 2002, the opening of an oral trial against the three defendants.

The oral hearing took place on March 12 and 13, 2003. The Fourth Section of the Criminal Chamber of the National Court issued on March 18, 2003, Sentence No. 10/2003. José Ignacio Krutxaga Elezkano, Lierni Armendáriz González de Langarika and Fernando García Jodrá were sentenced to  years in prison. They were condemned to 30 years for a crime of terrorist homicide with the burden of treachery, 2 years for a crime of motor vehicle theft and 2 years and a half for a crime of forgery of an official document. After this attack, there was no particular claim by the terrorist group ETA.

Bibliography 
 MERINO, A., CHAPA, A., Raíces de Libertad. pp. 209–217. FPEV (2011).  (in spanish)
This article makes use of material translated from the corresponding article in the Spanish-language Wikipedia.

References 

People's Party (Spain) politicians
People killed by ETA (separatist group)
Assassinated Spanish politicians
1958 births
2000 deaths